Elm St. is the debut album of singer/songwriter Ryan Cabrera. It was released in the year 2001 by AMP (American Music Productions).

Track listing 
Last Winter Intro
"Spanish Song" - 6:06
"Yesterday's Gone" - 3:54
In My Life - 5:04
My Friend John - 3:35
Reasons Intro
Reasons - 3:58
Lost Again - 5:40
I Will - 4:16
"Last Winter" - 6:49

References

External links
 

2001 debut albums
Ryan Cabrera albums